The 2015 Heineken Open was a tennis tournament played on outdoor hard courts. It was the 39th edition of the Heineken Open, and part of the ATP World Tour 250 series of the 2014 ATP World Tour. It took place at the ASB Tennis Centre in Auckland, New Zealand, from January 12 to 17, 2015.

Points and prize money

Point distribution

Prize money 

* per team

Singles main-draw entrants

Seeds

1 Rankings as of January 5, 2015.

Other entrants
The following players received wildcards into the singles main draw:
  Borna Ćorić
  Jose Rubin Statham
  Michael Venus

The following players received entry from the qualifying draw:
  Kenny de Schepper
  Alejandro González
  Go Soeda
  Jiří Veselý

The following players received entry as lucky losers:
  Alejandro Falla
  Lucas Pouille

Withdrawals
 Before the tournament
  David Ferrer → replaced by Alejandro Falla
  John Isner (preparation for Australian Open) → replaced by Juan Mónaco
  Gaël Monfils (personal reasons) → replaced by Albert Ramos Viñolas
  Tommy Robredo (adductor injury) → replaced by Lucas Pouille
  Jack Sock (hip injury) → replaced by Diego Schwartzman

Retirements
  Roberto Bautista Agut (retired due to illness)

Doubles main-draw entrants

Seeds

1 Rankings as of January 5, 2015.

Other entrants
The following pairs received wildcards into the doubles main draw:
  Artem Sitak /  Michael Venus
  Finn Tearney /  Wesley Whitehouse

Champions

Singles 

  Jiří Veselý def.  Adrian Mannarino, 6–3, 6–2

Doubles 

  Raven Klaasen /  Leander Paes def.  Dominic Inglot /  Florin Mergea, 7–6(7–1), 6–4

References

External links 
 

2015
2015 ATP World Tour
2015 in New Zealand tennis
January 2015 sports events in New Zealand
2015 Heineken Open